Kolomyia   was a military airfield located in Kolomyia, Ukraine. It had a regiment of MiG-25s (48 GvORAP) and  114th Tactical Aviation Brigade, MiG-29/UB, all part of 14th Air Army.

The base was also home to the 668th Bomber Aviation Regiment between 1945 and May 1954.

48nd GvORAP Special Guard Nizhnednistrovsky Order of Suvorov Intelligence Aviation Regiment 
48nd Special Guard Nizhnednistrovsky Order of Suvorov Intelligence Aviation Regiment - aviation connection Air Forces of the Armed Forces of Ukraine that existed before 2004. The regiment was based on the aerodrome in Kolomyia.

Part in the USSR Air Force 

As part of the current army from June 22, 1941, to July 14, 1941, and from September 16, 1941, to February 8, 1943.

On June 22, 1941, was based on the airfield in Windaw, having 54 SS available, was part of the 6th Combined Air Aviation, the war met as the 40th speed bomber air regiment.

On June 22, 1941, it took about 10 hours to make the first combat flight (excluding the departure of the reconnaissance aircraft at around 4 am in the Königsberg area) by landing at Königsberg, Tauragė, and Memel. According to Soviet data, the raid was completed successfully, bombs were dropped precisely on objects, the regiment did not have any losses. It was the first blow of Soviet bombers on military targets in the enemy's rear.

During the preparation of the Stalingrad offensive operation, the regiment participated in photographing the defensive positions of the enemy troops, resulting in the development of a single photo map of the entire district for senior military leadership.

On December 20, 1942, the regiment had 10 Pe-2, 10 Pe-3, 3 V-25s Mitchell.

As of January 1, 1943, the regiment had 11 planes Pe-3, which was 38% of the total combat composition; In addition, the regiment was armed with A-20B "Boston" aircraft. Subsequently, the proportion of A-20B "Boston" gradually increased in the regiment, and the number of Pe-3 decreased.

February 8, 1943, was transformed into the 48th Guards Aviation Regiment of the Far Scouts
The Main Command of the Red Army.

In 1956 he relocated to the Kolomyia airfield.

Commanders of the regiment in the period 1939-1992 

 Mogilevsky Ivan Evseevich 1939-1941
 Lavrentsov Ilarion Fedorovich 1941-1942
 Pavel Makarovich Sadov 1942-1944
 Lozenko Pavel Semenovich 1944-1946
 Artemyev Boris Petrovich 1946-1948
 Erkin Vasiliy Mikhailovich 1948-1953
 Romanov Alexander Ivanovich 1953-1956
 Delttsev Pavel Avdiyevich 1956-1957
 Chmakin Pavel Vasilyevich 1957-1962
 Matveev Gennady Pavlovich 1962-1966
 Zhigalkovich Nikolai Nikolayevich 1966-1972
 Theatrical Anatoly Petrovich 1972-1974
 Vedeneyev Valery Vasilievich 1974-1976
 Parshenin Yuri Ivanovich 1976-1979
 Lyashenko Viktor Yakovlevich 1979-1984
 Arbuzov Sergey Vasilievich 1984-1988
 Zinoviev Yuri Vasilievich 1988-1992

Heroes of the USSR 

The title of Hero of the Soviet Union was assigned to troops of the regiment:

 Rogov Oleksiy Georgiyovych
 Morgunov Yuriy Vasilyevich
 Sergeev Vsevolod Pavlovich
 Chervyakov Volodymyr Ivanovich
 Tkachevsky Yuri Matveyevich

Part of the Air Forces of Ukraine 

As part of the Armed Forces of Ukraine, the unit has always been one of the most capable units.

Commanders of the regiment during the period of independence 

 Sinenko Yuri Mikhailovich - 1992-1993
 Baranov Anatoly Nikolayevich - 1993-2000
 Levchuk Igor Sergeevich - 2000-2001
 Gennady Vladimirovich Stromylo - 2002–2004.

Arms 

On the armory of the regiment at various times there were reconnaissance planes: IL-28, Yakovlev Yak-25, Yak-27R,  Yak-28R , Mig-25,  Su-24MR,  Su-17M4P.

The regiment was disbanded in 2004. The planes Su-24MR were transferred to the Starokonstantinov airfield, and Su-17M4P in Zaporozhye.

In the media 

The episodes of the movie Three Percent Risk were shot at the airfield on the regiment. The main roles were played by Soviet actors Lavrov Kyrylo and Demyanenko Alexander Sergeevich.

References

External links 

 Photoarchive 48 REVIEW. Part 1
 Photoarchive 48 REVIEW. Part 2
 48 envelope on the site "Aviators of the Second World"
 Unofficial site of the 48th round

Airports in Ukraine
Buildings and structures in Ivano-Frankivsk Oblast
Soviet Air Force bases
Ukrainian airbases